Bakir Benaïssa (born 7 April 1931) is a Moroccan former long-distance runner who competed in the 1960 Summer Olympics in Rome, finishing 8th in the marathon in 2:21:21.4, and in the 1964 Summer Olympics in Tokyo. He won the 10,000 meters and finished second at the 5,000 meters at the Pan-Arab Games in Beirut in 1957, and won the quadrennial Mediterranean Games marathons in 1959 and 1963. He was  born in Rabat. The 1960 Rome marathon resulted in a world record for winner, Ethiopia's Abebe Bikila, with Benaïssa's teammate, Rhadi Ben Abdesselam, finishing a close second.

References

External links 
 Légende du Sport Marocain: Feu Abdeslam Radi 1960 Olympic Marathon video at YouTube
 Profile at trackfield.brinkster.net
 

Sportspeople from Rabat
Moroccan male marathon runners
Moroccan male long-distance runners
Olympic athletes of Morocco
Athletes (track and field) at the 1960 Summer Olympics
Athletes (track and field) at the 1964 Summer Olympics
Athletes (track and field) at the 1959 Mediterranean Games
Athletes (track and field) at the 1963 Mediterranean Games
Mediterranean Games medalists in athletics
Mediterranean Games gold medalists for Morocco
1931 births
Living people
20th-century Moroccan people
21st-century Moroccan people